Morgan McKinley is a global professional services recruitment consultancy. 
Founded in 1988, the company is located in key financial centers, with offices in the U.K, Australia, China, Hong Kong (China), Canada, Singapore, Ireland and Japan. The company's global head office is located in Cork, Ireland.

History 
Morgan McKinley was founded in the UK in 1995 as a banking & financial services recruitment consultancy. In 2008 The Premier Group, a recruitment company founded in Ireland in 1988, acquired the business for €60 million and rebranded all of its Irish and international recruitment operations Morgan McKinley.

In 2009 Irish Taoiseach Enda Kenny opened Morgan McKinley’s Shanghai office.  The company currently has offices in 19 locations in Europe, the Middle East, Asia-Pacific and India.

Recruitment monitoring 
Morgan McKinley’s market research and statistics are sometimes quoted in the media. In particular, the Employment Monitor has been quoted in Bloomberg,  The Irish Independent,  BBC News,  and Gulf Business. 

The company publishes the London Employment Monitor which is used as an indicator of the jobs market in the City of London. The company also publishes the Irish Employment Monitor which tracks employment trends in the Republic of Ireland. Morgan McKinley’s employment and salary surveys are also reported in global and local business media.

References 

Employment agencies of the United Kingdom
British companies established in 1995
Employment agencies of Ireland
Irish companies established in 1988
Companies based in Cork (city)